Scott Rider (born 22 September 1977) is a British bobsledder, shot putter and Highland games competitor.

Biography
Rider joined the British bobsleigh team in 2000, and he competed in the four man event at the 2002 Winter Olympics, where he and his team-mates finished 11th.

In shot putting, Rider represented England at three Commonwealth Games, in 2006, 2010 and 2014, finishing in the top ten in all three tournaments. He was also British outdoor champion in the shot put in 2014 and British indoor champion in 2003 and 2013. He is a member of Birchfield Harriers athletics club.

At the Highland games, Rider won the World Highland Games Championships in 2016. He was also World Caber Champion in 2013, 2014, 2016 and 2018.

He holds a BA in Sports Sciences and Art from Brunel University London.

References

External links
 

1977 births
Living people
Sportspeople from Harlow
Athletes from London
British male bobsledders
English male shot putters
British male shot putters
English strength athletes
Olympic bobsledders of Great Britain
Bobsledders at the 2002 Winter Olympics
Commonwealth Games competitors for England
Athletes (track and field) at the 2006 Commonwealth Games
Athletes (track and field) at the 2010 Commonwealth Games
Athletes (track and field) at the 2014 Commonwealth Games
British Athletics Championships winners
Alumni of Brunel University London